Zygogynum tanyostigma is a species of plant in the family Winteraceae. It is an evergreen shrub endemic to New Caledonia.

It has been found in only two locations, on Mont Colnett and Mont Panié in the northeast of Grande Terre, New Caledonia's main island. It is found in high-elevation kauri forest undergrowth on volcanic and sedimentary substrate from 1,350 and 1,615 meters elevation.

References

Endemic flora of New Caledonia
tanyostigma
Vulnerable plants
Taxonomy articles created by Polbot